The 2010 Dublin Horse Show was that year's edition of the Dublin Horse Show, the Irish official show jumping competition at Dublin. It was held as CSIO 5*. The main sponsor was Fáilte Ireland.

The first horse show was held in 1864 in Dublin by the Royal Agricultural Society of Ireland. Since 1868 it is held by the Royal Dublin Society. In 1926 International Competitions were introduced to this horse show for the first time, it was also the first year the Aga Khan Trophy was held.

The 2010 edition of the Fáilte Ireland Dublin Horse Show was held between 4 August 2010 and 8 August 2010.

FEI Nations Cup of Ireland 
The 2010 FEI Nations Cup of Ireland was part of the 2010 Dublin Horse Show. It was the eight and the last competition of the 2010 Meydan FEI Nations Cup.

The 2010 FEI Nations Cup of Ireland was held on Friday, 6 August 2010 at 2:55 pm. The competing teams were: France, the United States of America, Germany, Switzerland, the Netherlands, Ireland, Sweden, Great Britain and Spain (the team of Poland did not take part in this competition).

The competition was a show jumping competition with two rounds and optionally one jump-off. The fences were up to 1.60 meters high. Eight of ten (here: eight of nine) teams are allowed to start in the second round.

The competition is endowed with 200,000 €.

(grey penalty points do not count for the team result)

Land Rover Puissance 
The Puissance at 2010 Dublin Horse Show was the main show jumping competition on Saturday, 7 August 2010 at the 2010 Dublin Horse Show. It was held at 6:05 pm.

The competition was held as Puissance competition with one round and up to four jump-offs. It was endowed with €36,000, the sponsor of this competition was Land Rover.

(Top 5 of 15 Competitors)

The Longines International Grand Prix of Ireland 
The International Grand Prix of Ireland, the Show jumping Grand Prix of the 2010 Dublin Horse Show, was the major show jumping competition at this event. The sponsor of this competition was Longines. It was held on Sunday, 8 August 2010 at 3:00 pm. The competition was a show jumping competition with two rounds, the fences were up to 1.60 meters high.

It was endowed with 200,000 €. 

(Top 5 of 40 Competitors)

References

External links 
 official website
 2010 results

Dublin Horse Show, 2010
Dublin Horse Show
Dublin Horse Show
Dublin Horse Show, 2010
Dublin Horse Show
Dublin Horse Show